Lubycza Królewska  (Liubycha Korolivs’ka) is a town in Tomaszów Lubelski County, Lublin Voivodeship, in eastern Poland, close to the border with Ukraine. It is the seat of the gmina (administrative district) called Gmina Lubycza Królewska. The town is located in the historical region Galicia.

The town has an approximate population of 1,800.

References

Tomaszów Lubelski County
Cities and towns in Lublin Voivodeship